The Chief of the General Staff is the chief of defence of the Republic of China Armed Forces in Taiwan.

List of officeholders

See also
 Republic of China Armed Forces

References

Taiwan (ROC)